Orthetrum balteatum is a freshwater dragonfly species in the family Libellulidae, 
present in northern Australia and New Guinea. 
The common name for this species is speckled skimmer.

Orthetrum balteatum is a medium-sized, black dragonfly with yellow markings. The sides of its body are dark,
and it has clear wings without any coloured markings.

Gallery

See also
 List of Odonata species of Australia

References

Libellulidae
Odonata of Australia
Insects of New Guinea
Taxa named by Maurits Anne Lieftinck
Insects described in 1933